The Tindastól women's football team, commonly known as Tindastóll, is an Icelandic football team based in Sauðárkrókur. It is part of the Tindastóll multi-sport club.

History
On 18 August 2018, Tindastóll women's team achieved promotion from 2. deild kvenna to 1. deild kvenna. On 23 September 2020, Tindastóll achieved promotion to the top-tier Úrvalsdeild kvenna for the first time in its history. They made their Úrvalsdeild debut on 5 May 2021 with a 1–1 tie against Þróttur Reykjavík.

Titles
1. deild kvenna
Winners: 2020
2. deild kvenna
Runner-ups: 2018

Awards
2. deild kvenna Player of the Year: 
Murielle Tiernan - 2018

Notable players
  Dida
  Vanda Sigurgeirsdóttir
  Laura Rus

References

External links

Valur

Football clubs in Iceland
Úrvalsdeild Women clubs
Tindastóll